Security Bank Building may refer to:

Security Bank Building (Anniston, Alabama), listed on the National Register of Historic Places in Calhoun County, Alabama
Security Bank Building (Sioux Falls, South Dakota), listed on the National Register of Historic Places in Minnehaha County, South Dakota
Pacific Southwest Building in Fresno, California, formerly called the Security Bank Building